Eisenhuth is a surname. Notable people with the surname include:

 Laura J. Eisenhuth, North Dakota Politician in the late 1800s
 Matt Eisenhuth, Australian professional rugby league footballer
 Susie Eisenhuth, Australian theatre and film critic
 Tom Eisenhuth, Australian professional rugby league footballer

See also
Eisenhuth Horseless Vehicle Company, a manufacturer of Brass Age automobiles

German-language surnames